Kleinendorst is a German surname. Notable people with the surname include:

Kurt Kleinendorst (born 1960), American ice hockey coach, brother of Scot
Scot Kleinendorst (1960–2019), American ice hockey player

German-language surnames